The Ramat Rachel shooting attack was a mass shooting carried out by Jordanian Legion soldiers, on 23 September 1956, who opened fire across the Israel/Jordan border on a group of Israeli archaeologists working inside Israeli sovereign territory near Kibbutz Ramat Rachel. Four Jewish archaeologists were killed in the event and 16 others were wounded.

The attack
On Sunday, 23 September 1956, a tour was held for a group of Israeli archaeologists at the archaeological excavations near Kibbutz Ramat Rachel. During the tour machine-gun fire was opened on the archaeologists from Jordanian positions at Mar Elias Monastery near the Jerusalem-Bethlehem road. The fire killed four people, including the archaeologist Jacob Pinkerfeld, and 16 others were wounded. Another person who was seriously injured in the shooting died eventually of his wounds five years later.

Official reactions
 : Jordan expressed regret for the incident and blamed a single soldier who was "suddenly taken by madness".
 : Israeli foreign ministry spokesman called Jordan's version completely unfounded, quoting witnesses at the event who stated that two submachine guns and three rifles were clearly seen firing from two Jordanian army outposts across the border at the archaeologists in Ramat Rachel.

Aftermath 
In response to the Ramat Rachel shooting attack, The Israeli Defence Forces carried out the Operation Lulav on 25 September 1956; the counterattack was held in the Arab village Husan, near Bethlehem.

References

External links
 Gunfire Kills Three Israelis - Published in Milwaukee Journal on 23 September 1956 (dead link as of August 2016)

1956 in Israel
Mass murder in 1956
Terrorist incidents in Asia in 1956
Spree shootings in Israel
Murdered Israeli children
September 1956 events in Asia
Mass shootings in Israel
1956 mass shootings in Asia
1956 mass shootings
Terrorist incidents in Israel in the 1950s
History of archaeology
Israel–Jordan relations
Arab Legion